Wuhan New Era Football Club was a Chinese football club based in Wuhan, Hubei Province, founded in 2014 and dissolved in 2016. They attended Chinese FA Cup in 2015.

History
Wuhan New Era Football Club was founded by Yang Dongqiang on in 2014, attended China Amateur Football League in 2014 and achieved 14th place.

According to the rule of Chinese FA Cup, the club was not able to attend 2015 Chinese FA Cup. However, two football clubs which ranking was higher than them in China Amateur Football League in 2014 quit the 2015 Chinese FA Cup, leading to Wuhan New Era being eligible to participate.

In 2015 Chinese FA Cup, they first eliminated Guangxi Liuzhou Liuyue, another amateur team, then managed to upset China League One side Qingdao Hainiu with the score of 1-0, and advanced to the third round. However, they lost to Shandong Luneng Taishan there 1-6, despite their best efforts. 

In 2015 China Amateur Football League, they won the North-West series, but the team did not attend the final round of the football league---Due to treatment issues, its players refused to attend the matches.

In 2016, Wuhan Chufeng Heli was formed from the ashes of Wuhan New Era and Wuhan Hongxing.

2015 Chinese FA Cup Squad

References

Association football clubs established in 2014
Association football clubs disestablished in 2016
Sport in Wuhan
Defunct football clubs in China
2014 establishments in China
2016 disestablishments in China